Jonathan Cheever (born April 17, 1985) is an American snowboarder. He is an athlete on the U.S. Snowboarding's SBX A Team. In 2011, he was named the U.S. snowboarding champion and took two World Cup 2nd-place finishes at Stoneham Mountain Resort in Quebec and Chiesa in Valmalenco in Italy. Becoming the second American male ever in his discipline to win the world cup. In 2011, he was ranked third in the world in snowboard cross (SBX). Still no U.S. man has won a FIS World Cup title in SBX.

Jonathan is ranked 7th in 2017-2018 FIS World Cup standings after two races. A third-place finish at the first World Cup of the 2017-2018 in Cerro Catedral in Argentina put Cheever on the podium in back to back World Cups. Cheever and teammate, Mick Dierdorf, placed 2nd at the Team Snowboard Cross (BXT) FIS World Cup in Veysonnaz, Switzerland in March 2017.

Cheever is currently represented by Sho Kashima, one of Jonathan's best friends and former U.S. Ski Team athlete.

Personal background 
Cheever was born in Boston and grew up in Saugus, Massachusetts. He is the son of Mark and Dorene, and has one brother, Derek. He graduated from Malden Catholic High School, where he additionally served as president of the student body, and founder and president of the school's Snowboard and Ski Club. After high school graduation, he attended the University of Massachusetts Lowell. In 2004 Cheever became a licensed plumber.  Cheever resides in Park City, UT where he owns and operates Team Cheever Design Build, a general contracting, plumbing, and design firm.

Career
Cheever started skiing when he was eight years old at Nashoba Valley. During Thanksgiving of 1997, his parents put him free snowboarding lessons at Attitash Bear Peak in New Hampshire. Cheever jumped on a board and never looked back. He credits much of his success to the help he has received after meeting Nate Park in 2004.

In 2011, he took two second-place finishes on the World Cup. He additionally took the national title, earning him the title of best in the United States.

In 2014 Cheever produced " SBX the Movie " with Brett Saunders and Maria Ramberger. http://www.sbxthemovie.com

Much like every athlete on the U.S. Snowboard SBX team, Cheever's competitive snowboard background comes from all disciplines. Cheever has world cup starts in pipe and big air. He has pre-qualified 1st at US Open Slope Style and has won many freestyle and free ride competitions.

Standings 
2004–2005
 2nd Place in Halfpipe at New Zealand Snowboard Nationals 2004
 2nd Place in Boardercross at New Zealand South Island Champs 2004
 3rd Place in Halfpipe at New Zealand South Island Champs 2004
 2nd Place in Boardercross at Eastern Regionals in 2004
 4th Place in Halfpipe at Eastern Regionals in 2004
 4th Place in USASA Nationals Slopestyle in 2003
 4th Place in USASA Nationals Halfpipe in 2003
 1st Place at USASA Nationals for Overall Freestyle in 2003
 3rd Place at USASA Nationals Boardercross in 2001, 4th in 2002, 5th in 2003
 Ranked #1 in Maine USASA Halfpipe 01–02, 02-03
 Ranked #1 in Maine USASA SBX 01–02, 02-03, 03-04

2005–2006
 3rd Place in NorAm Cup Standings for 2005–2006 (missed two events)
 4th Place in SBX at NorAm Finals/Can Nationals at Mt. Avila 2006
 1st Place in SBX at USASA Nationals at Northstar 2006
 2nd Place in SBX at NorAm Cup at Big White, BC 2006
 16th Place in SBX at X-Games 2006
 4th Place in SBX Jabra X Jam at Sugarbowl 2005
 5th Place in SBX at U.S. National/NorAm 2005
 Best Trick Rail Billabong Slopestyle Jam at Snowpark, New Zealand 2005
 9th Place in Halfpipe at New Zealand Snowboard Nationals 2005
 5th Place in Slopestyle at Western Regionals in 2005
 5th Place in Halfpipe at Western Regionals in 2005

2006–2007
 3rd Place NorAm Finals SBX Cypress, BC 2007
 2nd Place Suzuki Champions Cross Sugarloaf, Maine 2007
 Highest Air World Cup Quarter Pipe Competition, Lake Placid, New York 2007
 6th Place World Cup Quarter Pipe competition, Lake Placid, New York 2007
 7th Place in Slopestyle at Coca-Cola Cardrona Games, 2006
 4th Place in Halfpipe at Coca-Cola Cardrona Games, 2006
 2nd Place in SBX at Coca-Cola Cardrona Games, 2006
 2nd Place in Quiksilver King of the Park at Snowpark, New Zealand 2006

2007–2008
 5th Place Canadian Nationals Cypress, BC 2008
 8th Place Jeep King of the Mountain Sun Valley, Idaho 2008
 10th Place Stoneham World Cup, Quebec 2008
 7th Place Lake Placid World Cup Lake Placid, New York 2008
 6th Place US Grand Prix Tamarack, ID 2008
 6th Place Jeep King of the Mountain Squaw Valley 2008

2008–2009
 Finished 2008–2009 Snowboard Season Ranked 6th in the World in SBX
 Finished 2008–2009 Snowboard Season Ranked 3rd in the US in SBX
 5th Place SBX World Cup Valmalenco, Italy 2009
 2nd Place SBX World Cup Stoneham Quebec 2009
 5th Place SBX World Cup Cypress, Vancouver (Olympic Venue) 2009
 6th Place 2009 Winter X Games
 6th Place Chapelco Argentina World Cup 2008

2009–2010 (season-ending injury)
In February 2010, Cheever broke his right ankle, while attempting double corks on a trampoline at the USSA Center of Excellence.

2010–2011
 1st USASA Open Class SBX *
 1st GNU Guts N' Glory Canyons, Utah
 3rd in World Cup Standings for 2010-2011 Winter (Top Ranked American)
 2nd Place SBX World Cup, Valmalenco Italy 2011
 2nd Place SBX World Cup, Stoneham, Quebec 2011
 2010–2011 US National SBX Champion
 2nd Place US SBX Grand Prix Canyons, Utah 2011
 5th Place 2011 Winter X Games Boarder X
 2nd Place Team SBX World Cup Telluride, Colorado 2010
 6th Place SBX World Cup Telluride, Colorado 2010
 8th Place FIS Snowboarding World Championships 2011 – Men's snowboard cross in La Molina, Spain

References

External links 
 
 
 
 
 
 http://sbxmagazine.com/interviews/jonathan-cheever
 http://www.wickedlocal.com/saugus/features/x1405317616/Saugus-native-Jonathan-Cheever-excels-at-snowboard-cross
 http://www.deseretnews.com/article/700109619/Snowboarding-Jonathan-Cheever-Jacobellis-grab-Grand-Prix-championship-at-Park-City.html
 http://www.levelfieldfund.org/news

American male snowboarders
People from Saugus, Massachusetts
1985 births
Living people
Malden Catholic High School alumni
Snowboarders at the 2018 Winter Olympics
Olympic snowboarders of the United States
Sportspeople from Essex County, Massachusetts